Bhulajhora Gewog is a former gewog (village block) of Chukha District, Bhutan. The gewog had an area of 73 square kilometres and contained 17 villages. Bhulajhora Gewog was part of Phuentsholing Dungkhag, along with Dala, Logchina, and Phuentsholing Gewogs.

References

Former gewogs of Bhutan
Chukha District